The Volunteer Worker is a 1940 American commercial Donald Duck short film directed by Riley Thomson and produced by Walt Disney for the Community Chests of America.

Plot
Donald Duck is collecting for charity, but everyone refuses to donate. Saddened by his failure he sits on a sidewalk next to a worker and tells  him his troubles.  The worker tells Donald that he was helped by charity once, and although he can't give too much, he still wants to donate.  Donald is excited by the donation and gives the worker a "I Gave" button, which the worker proudly displays.

Voice cast
 Clarence Nash as Donald Duck / Butch the Bulldog
 Charles Judels as the Sidewalk Worker

Home media
The short was released on May 18, 2004, on Walt Disney Treasures: The Chronological Donald, Volume One: 1934-1941.

References

External links 
 

Donald Duck short films
Films produced by Walt Disney
1940s Disney animated short films
1940 animated films
1940 films